Bernard Ménez (born 8 August 1944, in Mailly-le-Chateau) is a French actor. He has appeared in more than seventy films since 1969.

Selected filmography

References

External links
 

People from Yonne
1944 births
Living people
French male film actors
French male television actors